Tonndorf is a municipality in the Weimarer Land district of Thuringia, Germany. The nearest train station is the village München (part of Bad Berka) at the railway from Kranichfeld to Weimar, about four kilometers east of Tonndorf.

References

Weimarer Land
Grand Duchy of Saxe-Weimar-Eisenach